The 1996 PBA Commissioner's Cup Finals was the best-of-7 series basketball championship of the 1996 PBA Commissioner's Cup, and the conclusion of the conference's playoffs. The Alaska Milkmen and Formula Shell Zoom Masters played for the 64th championship contested by the league.

The Alaska Milkmen won against the Formula Shell Zoom Masters in a thrilling seven-game series, grabbing their second championship for the season.

Qualification

Series scoring summary

Games summary

Game 1

Shell trailed by 14 points, 48–62, when Ken Redfield and Jolly Escobar teamed up as the Gas kings pulled even at 70-all at the start of the final period. Benjie Paras' jumper gave Shell a 78–76 lead but Jojo Lastimosa knocked in a booming triple to give the advantage back to Alaska, the lead change hands two more times before Paras and Peter Naron combined for five straight points for an 85-81 cushion going into the final two minutes, Lastimosa converted on a technical free throw to cut the deficit down, the Milkmen had the opportunity when Ken Redfield fouled out with 39.6 remaining, a block by Paras on Jeffrey Cariaso with 30 seconds left signalled the doom for the Milkmen as they bungled on their next offensive play.

Game 2

The Milkmen broke away early in the first half, the Alaska defense held Shell import Ken Redfield to just 18 points, the Gas kings clawed back to within four, 86–90, on two free throws by Redfield. Sean Chambers sealed the win with an alley-oop with 12.2 seconds left.

Game 3

Ken Redfield poured in 35 points and hit a crucial three point-shot with 56.1 seconds left, the Milkmen managed to trim down the lead to 77–80 with 2:01 to go, from a 59–70 deficit at the start of the fourth quarter.

Game 4

The Milkmen appeared on a verge of giving the Zoom Masters a huge 3–1 edge when it trailed 76–72 with just over a minute to go, held Shell the rest of the way with a 7-0 blast. Bong Hawkins ignited that fiery endgame run with a triple, trimming the gap to a hairline, 76–75, after an exchange of miscues, Alaska took the driver's seat as Jojo Lastimosa and Johnny Abarrientos sank two free throws each, Richie Ticzon of Shell missed a potential game-tying three-pointer in the dying seconds, allowing Alaska to escaped with a come-from-behind victory.

Game 5

In the lowest scoring game in PBA finals history, Johnny Abarrientos' jumper with 10.9 seconds left put the game beyond recall at 68–63.

Game 6

Alaska coach Tim Cone predicted the series will end in Game Six, for a while, the Milkmen looks headed to finish off the Zoom Masters, leading 85–79, but Shell's underrated players thwarted Alaska's bid, Richie Ticzon did an almost impossible shot to snatch the game from Alaska when the Zoom Masters regained the upper hand at 86–85. Ticzon's shot wasn't expected to go, hounded by the defenders and deep down the right side of the court, threw a prayer of a fadeaway jumper that went in, the crowd went into a frenzy as Shell celebrated after that miracle shot.

Game 7

Jojo Lastimosa's insurance free throws with 9.6 seconds left settled the issue as the Milkmen took an 81–77 advantage, the Zoom Masters trailed by as much as 10 points, 75–65, entering the closing minutes, but a 10-0 blast anchored by best import Kenny Redfield's five points, locked the count at 75-all with 2:20 remaining, Bong Hawkins and Jojo Lastimosa provided the backbreaking jumpers giving Alaska a 79–75 lead with 1:23 to go.

Awards
Finals MVP: Bong Hawkins (Alaska)  
Best Player of the Conference: Johnny Abarrientos (Alaska)
Best Import of the Conference: Kenny Redfield (Shell)

Rosters

Broadcast notes

References

External links
PBA official website

1996 PBA season
1996
Alaska Aces (PBA) games
Shell Turbo Chargers games
PBA Commissioner's Cup Finals
PBA Commissioner's Cup Finals